José Dionisio López (1901 – death date unknown) was a Cuban outfielder in the Negro leagues and the Cuban League in the 1910s and 1920s.

A native of Regla, Cuba, López played in the Negro leagues for the Cuban Stars (West) in 1920. He also played in the Cuban League for the Habana and Almendares clubs between 1918 and 1928, and played minor league baseball in the 1920s for such clubs as the Columbus Senators and the Waco Cubs.

References

External links
 and Baseball-Reference Minor League Baseball Stats and Seamheads

1901 births
Date of birth missing
Year of death missing
Place of death missing
Almendares (baseball) players
Cuban Stars (West) players
Habana players
Cuban expatriate baseball players in the United States